Vladimir Wassilievich Sterligov (1904–1973) was a Soviet avant garde painter and poet, considered by art professionals to be the last of the Soviet Avant-garde artists. A former student of Kazimir Malevich, he succeeded in stepping beyond the boundary of Suprematism, creating a new and original system.

References

External links
 The Heritage of the Russian Avant-Garde: Vladimir Sterligov and His School (Zimmerli Art Museum, Rutgers)

Soviet avant-garde
Soviet painters
1904 births
1973 deaths